Yasha Levine (February 22, 1981) is a Russian-American investigative journalist, author and reporter. Levine, who was born in the Soviet Union in the early 1980s, was raised in San Francisco, California.

Levine's family emigrated from the Soviet Union in 1989 when Levine was 8-years-old, first living in a Gresten, Austria refugee camp before living in Castelfusano, Italy (near Ostia, Rome) for five months. In 1990, Levine and his family left Italy for New York. Levine has a brother Eli.
 
He is a former editor of Moscow-based satirical newspaper The eXile. He has written the book Surveillance Valley: The Secret Military History of the Internet which was published in 2018. The New Yorker reviewed Surveillance Valley positively describing it as "forceful" and "salutary". Levine's other books include A Journey Through California's Oligarch Valley, The Koch Brothers: A Short History, and The Corruption of Malcolm Gladwell. Levine was previously a correspondent at PandoDaily. He has also written for Wired, The Nation, Slate, TIME, The New York Observer, and more. He is a co-founder of the S.H.A.M.E. Project.

Bibliography

Filmography

References

External links
Official website
Immigrants as a Weapon

 

Russian journalists
Russian emigrants to the United States
American male journalists
American investigative journalists
American male non-fiction writers
Living people
American people of Russian-Jewish descent
American writers of Russian descent
1981 births